Andreas Evald Cornelius (born 16 March 1993) is a Danish professional footballer who plays as a striker for Copenhagen and the Denmark national team.

Club career

F.C. Copenhagen
Cornelius had joined the FC Copenhagen first team squad for its training camps in July 2011 and January 2012.

On 9 April 2012, he played his first Superliga match, coming on as a substitute for César Santin against AGF at NRGi Park in Aarhus. In the previous Superliga match (against Brøndby at Parken Stadium on 5 April 2012), he had been an unused substitute. On 20 May 2012, it was announced that Cornelius would join the first team squad on a permanent basis at the beginning of the upcoming season, together with Christoffer Remmer and Jakob Busk.

Cornelius scored his first goal for Copenhagen against Midtjylland in the first game of the new 2012–13 season. He scored the opening goal against Odense in a 2–2 draw. He also  scored the winning goal against Molde FK in the Europa League on 20 September.

Cornelius was awarded player of the month in the Danish Superliga on 7 October 2012. On 15 April, he scored the final goal in a 3–2 win against FC Nordsjælland. This gave FCK a 10-point lead in the league to number 2, and was crucial for Copenhagen winning the title.

Even though Cornelius only played one full season with the first team, he quickly became one of the most popular players of the club, as the print with his name and number on the official shirts being the most popular, selling around 40% of all prints.

Cardiff City
On 27 June 2013, Cardiff City announced they had signed Cornelius, for a club record fee. Reports from Denmark suggested a fee of 75 million Danish kroner (approximately £8 million). On 1 July, Cornelius completed his medical and signed a five-year deal with the club, saying "I've been given a great opportunity and this is a very exciting project that's taking place at Cardiff City." Twenty-three days later, he made his debut in a friendly against Forest Green Rovers and scored a goal in a 4–3 victory. However, he sustained a minor injury to his ankle during training the following week, and consequently missed out on the team's first ever Premier League game, against West Ham United on 17 August.

Cornelius made his competitive debut for Cardiff on 25 August against Manchester City, coming on as a stoppage-time replacement for Fraizer Campbell who had scored twice in the 3–2 home victory. Three days later, in a League Cup match against League Two club Accrington Stanley, he made his first competitive start for the club in a 2–0 win; however he re-aggravated the ankle injury he had picked up in pre-season following a heavy tackle and was carried off on a stretcher just before half-time. The injury would prove worse than first feared; and left Cornelius on the sidelines for the next three months, meaning he missed 10 games for Cardiff, as well as the chance to compete for his country Denmark in their final qualification games for the 2014 FIFA World Cup in Brazil.

During the final international break of 2013, Cornelius once again began training with the first team squad, in order to be accessed by the medical staff. They deemed that he was fit to return to action, and therefore arranged a behind closed door friendly with Championship club Yeovil Town on 14 November. He played 60 minutes as planned in a 2–1 defeat and told the media that he was fit and ready to return to action.

F.C. Copenhagen return
On 31 January 2014, Cornelius returned to F.C. Copenhagen for an undisclosed fee, but Cardiff claim they lost most of the money they paid for him. He scored a hat-trick in his first game back at Copenhagen in a friendly match against Slovan Liberec. On 23 February 2014, Cornelius made his first competitive start after re-signing with the club and crowned his comeback with a header to put his team 1–0 in front against AGF at NRGi Park. The match ended in a 1-1 draw.

Cornelius ended his first half season with 5 goals in 13 appearances, including a brace against Randers FC in Parken where he dribbled past four men before sending the ball into the back of the net. In April 2015, he suffered a "horrific" ankle injury during Copenhagen's match against Silkeborg IF.

Atalanta
On 2 May 2017, it was announced that Cornelius would join Serie A side Atalanta for a fee of around €3.5 million.

Bordeaux loan
On 31 August 2018, hours before the closing of the 2018 summer transfer window, Cornelius joined Ligue 1 side FC Girondins de Bordeaux on loan for the season. The deal reportedly included an option for Bordeaux to sign him permanently for a fee between €7 and 8 million.

Parma
On 18 July 2019, Cornelius signed to Serie A club Parma a 2-years loan with an obligation to buy. On 20 October 2019, Cornelius came off the bench in the 11th to substitute the injured Roberto Inglese, and scored a hat trick in a 5–1 home win against Genoa within a span of eight minutes. Cornelius scored a second hat-trick again against Genoa later on in the season in a 4–1 away win.

Trabzonspor
On 8 August 2021, Cornelius joined Süper Lig side Trabzonspor in a permanent deal. On 30 April 2022, Trabzonspor were crowned Turkish league champions for the first time in 38 years, clinching the title with a 2–2 draw against Antalyaspor.

Return to Copenhagen
On deadline day, 31 August 2022, Cornelius returned to his former club F.C. Copenhagen for the third time, signing a deal until June 2027.

International career
In May 2018 he was named in Denmark’s preliminary 35-man squad for the 2018 World Cup in Russia. He played in 3 of Denmark's 4 games, starting in the final group match vs France and the round of 16 match against Croatia. Cornelius did not score any goals in the World Cup.

In June 2021, he was included in the national team's bid for 2020 UEFA Euro, where the team reached the semi-finals.

On 7 November 2022, he was included in the final 26-man squad for the 2022 FIFA World Cup in Qatar.

Career statistics

Club

International

Scores and results list Denmark's goal tally first.

Honours
Copenhagen
Danish Superliga: 2012–13, 2015–16, 2016–17
Danish Cup: 2014–15, 2015–16, 2016–17

Trabzonspor
Süper Lig: 2021–22
Turkish Super Cup: 2022

Individual
Danish Superliga Golden Boot: 2012–13
Danish Superliga Player of the Year: 2012–13
Copenhagen Player of the Season: 2012–13

References

External links

National team profile 

1993 births
Living people
Footballers from Copenhagen
Danish men's footballers
Association football forwards
F.C. Copenhagen players
Cardiff City F.C. players
Atalanta B.C. players
FC Girondins de Bordeaux players
Parma Calcio 1913 players
Trabzonspor footballers
Danish Superliga players
Premier League players
Serie A players
Ligue 1 players
Süper Lig players
Denmark youth international footballers
Denmark under-21 international footballers
Denmark international footballers
2018 FIFA World Cup players
UEFA Euro 2020 players
2022 FIFA World Cup players
Danish expatriate men's footballers
Expatriate footballers in Wales
Expatriate footballers in Italy
Expatriate footballers in France
Expatriate footballers in Turkey
Danish expatriate sportspeople in Wales
Danish expatriate sportspeople in Italy
Danish expatriate sportspeople in France
Danish expatriate sportspeople in Turkey